The Akaflieg München Mü3 Kakadu is a glider designed and built in Germany in 1928.

Development 
The Mü3 "Kakadu" was the first high performance glider designed and built at Akaflieg München. The Mü3 "Kakadu" was completed in time for the 1928  Rhön Competition at the Wasserkuppe, emerging as an impressive aircraft with a tapered wing, circular section fuselage and smooth lines. Designed by  Dr. August Kupper, (nicknamed “Kakadu”), the Mü3 was regarded as the forerunner of the high aspect ratio, low induced drag sailplanes that emerged in the 1930s, such as 'Fafnir' and 'Austria'. Throughout the thirties the  Mü3 Kakadu remained the highest performance glider at Akaflieg München being used for competition flying as well as mountain flying research.

Specifications (Mü3 Kakadu')

See also

References

1920s German sailplanes
Mu03
Aircraft first flown in 1928